Heytesbury is a village (formerly considered to be a town) and a civil parish in Wiltshire, England.

The civil parish includes most of the small neighbouring settlement of Tytherington, and the deserted village of Imber.

History
Chalk downland north of Heytesbury village has prehistoric earthworks including long barrows and round barrows. Strip lynchets are visible north and east of Cotley Hill.

The parish lies between the Iron Age hillforts of Scratchbury Camp and Knook Castle. A Romano-British settlement has been identified on Tytherington Hill, in the far south of the parish. Chapperton Down, west of Imber, has evidence of settlement and field systems from the same period and earlier.

The Domesday Book of 1086 recorded a small settlement of eight households at Hestrebe, with a church. The hundred of Heytesbury, south and east of Warminster, comprised seventeen places.

The Hungerford family held land at Heytesbury by the 1390s, and reared sheep in the surrounding area in the next century. Family members include Walter Hungerford, 1st Baron Hungerford of Heytesbury.

John Marius Wilson's Imperial Gazetteer of England and Wales (1870–1872) described Heytesbury as follows:

HEYTESBURY, a small town, a parish, a sub-district, and a hundred, in Wilts. The town stands on the river Wylye, and on the Somerset and Weymouth railway, near Salisbury Plain, 4 miles SE by E of Warminster; was known, to the Saxons, as Hegtredesbiryg; took afterwards the names of Haresbury, Haseberie, and Heightsbury; is now commonly called Hatchbury; was, in the time of Stephen, the residence of the Empress Maud; was, in 1766, nearly all destroyed by fire, and afterwards rebuilt; consists now chiefly of a single street; possesses interest to tourists as the central point of a region abounding in British, Roman, Saxon, and Danish remains; and gives the title of Baron to the family of A'Court. It sent two members to parliament from the time of Henry VI till disfranchised by the act of 1832; was a borough by prescription; and is now a seat of courts leet. It has a post office under Bath, a railway station, two chief inns, a church, an Independent chapel, a national school, and an endowed hospital. The church dates from the 12th century; was partly rebuilt in 1470; underwent a thorough restoration in 1866, at an expense of about £5,500; is cruciform; has a massive tower; and contains the burial place of the A'Courts, and a tablet to Cunningham, the antiquary. The hospital was founded in 1470, by Lady Hungerford, for a chaplain, twelve poor men, and one poor woman; was rebuilt in 1769; forms three sides of a square, two stories high; and has an endowed income of £1,373. A weekly market was formerly held; and two fairs are still held on 14 May and 25 Sept. – The parish comprises 3,380 acres. Real property, £4,713. Pop., in 1841, 1,311; in 1861, 1,103. Houses, 237. The manor belonged to the Burghershs; and passed to the Badlesmeres, the Hungerfords, the Hastingses, and others. Heytesbury House, the seat of Lord Heytesbury, is on the N side of the town; was partially rebuilt about 1784; contains a fine collection of pictures: and stands in a well wooded park. Cotley Hill rises from the woods of the park; commands a very fine panoramic view; is crowned by a tumulus; and was anciently fortified. Knook castle, Scratchbury camp, Golden barrow, and many other antiquities are in the neighbourhood. The living is a vicarage, united with the vicarage of Knook, in the diocese of Salisbury. Value, £350. Patron, the Bishop of Salisbury. – The sub-district contains also eleven other parishes, and is in Warminster district. Acres, 27,546. Pop., 4,372. Houses, 946. – The hundred contains thirteen parishes, and part of another. Acres, 33,040. Pop., 5,572. Houses, 1,209.

Between 1449 and 1832, Heytesbury was a parliamentary borough, returning two members of parliament.

An elementary school was provided in 1838, immediately southwest of the church. By 1858 there were 50-60 pupils and 40-50 infants. The school moved to a new site, off the High Street west of the church, in 1900, and came under Wiltshire County Council control in the early years of that century. Children of all ages attended until 1931 when those over 11 transferred to the new Avenue Senior School at Warminster. The school continues to serve Heytesbury and Tytherington as Heytesbury CofE Primary School.

Religious sites

Church of England 

A church was mentioned at Hestrebe in the Domesday Book of 1086 and became a collegiate church in the 12th century. The present parish church is from the 13th century and is a Grade I listed building.

At Tytherington, a chapel was founded in the 12th century. The small church of St James is mainly from the 16th and is Grade II* listed.

St Giles' Church, Imber, dates from the late 13th century and is a Grade I listed building. It is now a redundant church in the care of the Churches Conservation Trust.

Non-conformist 
A Congregational chapel was built in Heytesbury village in 1812 and replaced c. 1868. The chapel closed sometime after 1955. There was a Primitive Methodist chapel at Tytherington.

Notable people

Elizabeth Wydeville (1437–1492), wife of Edward IV, mother of Elizabeth of York and the Princes in the Tower, was housed at the East Manor, with Elizabeth of York and her four sisters, following the sudden illness and subsequent death of Edward IV.

The antiquary William Cunnington (1754–1810) was of Heytesbury, and investigated many prehistoric sites on the downs.

Heytesbury House was built for the Ashe à Court family. Sir William à Court was created a Baronet in 1795 and the Baronry of Heytesbury was created in 1828 for his son, also Sir William.

The poet Siegfried Sassoon spent the latter part of his life at Heytesbury House, which he purchased in 1933. His son George Sassoon grew up there and inherited the house on his father's death in 1967; he lived there until 1996, when it was sold.

Major-General Glyn Gilbert (1920–2003) settled at Heytesbury.

Notable buildings
Heytesbury House, a country house rebuilt in 1782, is Grade II* listed. In 1985 the southern part of the park surrounding the house was the subject of a compulsory purchase order to allow construction of the A36 bypass, separating the house from its cricket field and requiring a new entrance to be made from the west. The gate piers and curved flanking walls at the former southern entrance, from the early 19th century, are still standing. In the early 21st century the house and stables were converted into several residences.

The Hospital of St John and St Katherine was founded in 1442 by Walter Hungerford, 1st Baron Hungerford and re-endowed in 1472 by Margaret, widow of his son Robert. The almshouse provided housing for twelve poor unmarried men and one woman (who was responsible for domestic duties), under the oversight of a chaplain or warden appointed by the Chancellor of Salisbury Cathedral. There was a school-house and from time to time a schoolmaster. Around 1769 the hospital burned down and a new building was erected, of two stories around three sides of a courtyard. The architect was Esau Reynolds (1725–1779) of Trowbridge. In 1968 the building was designated as Grade II listed. The hospital continues as a registered charity.

On the High Street is a small octagonal village lock-up or blind house, probably dating from the 18th century.

Local government
A parish council known as "Heytesbury, Imber and Knook" covers this parish and the neighbouring parish of Knook. Local government services are provided by Wiltshire Council, which has its offices in nearby Trowbridge.

Transport
The A36 road bypasses the village to the north; an Ordnance Survey map of 1958 shows the road's earlier route along the High Street. The Wessex Main Line railway (opened here in 1856) runs to the south, and until 1955 there was a station on the Heytesbury-Tytherington road.

See also
Heytesbury (UK Parliament constituency)
Baron Heytesbury

References

External links
 Parish of Heytesbury, Imber, Knook and Tytherington
 History of Heytesbury at Wiltshire Community History
 History of Heytesbury House – David Gray

Villages in Wiltshire
Civil parishes in Wiltshire